The Amyotha Hluttaw (House of Nationalities) is the de jure upper house of the Pyidaungsu Hluttaw, the bicameral legislature of Myanmar (Burma). It consists of 224 members, of whom 168 are directly elected and 56 appointed by the Myanmar Armed Forces. The last elections to the Amyotha Hluttaw were held in November 2015. At its second meeting on 3 February 2016, Mahn Win Khaing Than and Aye Thar Aung were elected Speaker and Deputy Speaker of the Amyotha Hluttaw and Speaker and Deputy Speaker of the Pyidaungsu Hluttaw as a whole.

After the coup d'état on 1 February 2021, the Pyidaungsu Hluttaw was dissolved by Acting President Myint Swe, who declared a one-year state of emergency and transferred all legislative powers to Commander-in-Chief of Defence Services Min Aung Hlaing.

Composition

House of Nationalities (Amyotha Hluttaw) consists of 224 members: 168 directly elected and 56 appointed by the Myanmar Armed Forces. Twelve representatives are elected by each state or region (inclusive of relevant Union territories, and including one representative from each Self-Administered Division or Self-Administered Zone).

2016–2021

2015 results are as of 20 November 2015. Military appointees are not included in the Amyotha Hluttaw by Regions and States, 2015 table.

2011–2016

See also

 Politics of Burma
 List of legislatures by country
 Assembly of the Union
 State and Region Hluttaws

References

History of Myanmar (1948–present)
Legislatures of Myanmar
Burma